Matthew Tennyson is an English actor of stage and screen. He won the Evening Standard Award for Outstanding Newcomer in 2012.

Early life
Tennyson was born in Stoke Newington, London, the son of Jonathan Tennyson, a physics professor, and a nurse. He is a great-great-great-grandson of poet laureate Alfred, Lord Tennyson. He trained at the London Academy of Music and Dramatic Art (LAMDA), graduating in 2011.

Career
Tennyson made his professional stage debut in 2011 under the direction of Trevor Nunn in the role of Percy in Flare Path at the Theatre Royal Haymarket, followed by a "sensitive" performance as Jamie in Beautiful Thing at The Royal Exchange for which he received the Best Newcomer award at the 2011 Manchester Theatre Awards. The following year he was the recipient of the 2012 Milton Shulman Award for Outstanding Newcomer at the Evening Standard Awards for his performance as Eric in Making Noise Quietly at the Donmar Warehouse. In 2013 he made "a keen impression" as Edwards in Blue Stockings and played a "fascinatingly ethereal" Puck in Shakespeare's A Midsummer Night's Dream, both performances at Shakespeare's Globe.

His television roles include Clarence in The Hollow Crown (Henry IV Parts I and II), Arlo in Da Vinci's Demons (Season 1 Episode 1 'The Hanged Man') and Ottaviano Riario in Borgia (Season 2 Episodes 11 and 12). He has also appeared in the ITV detective dramas Midsomer Murders and Grantchester, and the BBC TV period drama Father Brown.

On radio, Tennyson played "Jonesy" in Radio 4 play "Jonesy" by Tom Wells broadcast in February 2014. He featured in the 2014 film Pride, directed by Matthew Warchus.

In 2017 Tennyson played the title role in the Royal Shakespeare Company's gender-fluid 2017 production of Oscar Wilde's Salomé directed by Owen Horsley, the part being cross-cast to mark the 50th anniversary of the decriminalisation of homosexuality in England and Wales.

References

External links
 

Year of birth missing (living people)
Living people
People from Stoke Newington
Male actors from London
English male stage actors
English male television actors
Alumni of the London Academy of Music and Dramatic Art
Matthew